Li Song or Song Li is the name of:

People surnamed Li
Emperor Shunzong of Tang (761–806), emperor of the Tang dynasty
Li Song (politician) (died 948), politician of Later Tang, Later Jin, Liao and Later Han dynasties during the Five Dynasties period
Li Song (painter) ( 1190–1230), Song dynasty imperial court painter
Song Li (bioengineer) (born 1965), Chinese-born bioengineering researcher at the University of California Los Angeles, USA
Li Song (minister), (1358-1422) Ming dynasty Minister of Works
People surnamed Song
Song Li (speed skater) (born 1981), Chinese speed skater